Textron Marine & Land Systems, formerly  Cadillac Gage, is an American military contractor that manufactures armored vehicles, turrets, advanced marine craft, surface effects ships, and other weapon systems. It is owned by Textron, and was formed in the merger between Cadillac Gage and Textron Marine in 1994.

Products
Today, as Textron Marine & Land Systems it produces:

M1117 Armored Security Vehicle – for the U.S. Army
Textron Tactical Armoured Patrol Vehicle – for the Canadian Army
Landing Craft Air Cushion (LCAC) – for the U.S. Navy
Ship-to-Shore Connector
47-foot Motor Lifeboat (MLB) – for the U.S. Coast Guard
NAIAD Rigid Hull Inflatable Boat
Cadillac Gage turret systems 
Tiger Light Protected Vehicle

The main office for Textron Marine & Land Systems is located in Slidell, Louisiana.

History
Cadillac Gage, located in Warren, Michigan manufactured many Vietnam-era military vehicles and artillery pieces:

 Stoner 63 modular weapon system 1963-1971
 Cadillac Gage V-100 Commando Armored Personnel Carrier
 V-100
 V-150
 V-200
 LAV-300 light armored vehicle
 LAV-600 light armored vehicle
 Commando Scout
 Cadillac Gage Ranger/Peacekeeper Armored Personnel Carrier - based on Dodge Ram/Dodge D Series chassis
 Stingray light tank
 Stingray 2

On March 31, 2015, Textron signed a contract with US Navy worth $84 million to build two new Landing Craft Air Cushion vehicles, LCACs 102 and 103. The craft are part of the Ship to Shore Connector (SSC) program, developed to replace the existing fleet of LCACs.

Notes and references

Manufacturing companies based in Louisiana
Firearm manufacturers of the United States
Military vehicle manufacturers
Companies based in New Orleans
St. Tammany Parish, Louisiana
Defense companies of the United States
Slidell, Louisiana
Textron